The 2017 Liga 3 West Nusa Tenggara is the third edition of Liga 3 West Nusa Tenggara as a qualifying round for the 2017 Liga 3. 

The competition scheduled starts on 31 July 2017.

Teams
There are 12 clubs which will participate the league in this season. 5 clubs are from Sumbawa Region and 7 clubs are from Lombok Region.

Group stage 
This stage scheduled starts on 31 July 2017.

Sumbawa Region

Lombok Region 
Lombok Region divided into two groups.

Group A Lombok

Group B Lombok 
Each club plays against two clubs instead of all three clubs.

Regional semifinals

Knockout stage

References 

2017 in Indonesian football
Sport in West Nusa Tenggara